The 2016 season was the eighth season for Seattle Sounders FC in Major League Soccer (MLS), the top flight of professional club soccer in the United States. The team were managed by Sigi Schmid until his firing in late July; he was replaced by Brian Schmetzer on an interim basis. The Sounders won their first MLS Cup in the 2016 final against Toronto FC, which ended in a penalty shootout after a scoreless draw.

Roster

Competitions

Preseason

Scrimmages

Desert Friendlies

Major League Soccer

League tables

Western Conference

Overall

Results summary

Results by matchday

Matches

MLS Cup Playoffs

Knockout round

Western Conference Semifinals

Western Conference Finals

MLS Cup Final

U.S. Open Cup

CONCACAF Champions League

2015–16

Quarterfinals

Mid-season friendlies

Statistics

Appearances and goals

Last updated on December 11, 2016.

|-
|colspan="14"|Players out on loan:

|-
|colspan="14"|Players who left the club during the season:

[S2] - S2 player

Transfers 

For transfers in, dates listed are when Sounders FC officially signed the players to the roster. Transactions where only the rights to the players are acquired are not listed. For transfers out, dates listed are when Sounders FC officially removed the players from its roster, not when they signed with another club. If a player later signed with another club, his new club will be noted, but the date listed here remains the one when he was officially removed from Sounders FC roster.

In

Draft picks 

Draft picks are not automatically signed to the team roster. Only those who are signed to a contract will be listed as transfers in. Only trades involving draft picks and executed after the start of 2015 MLS SuperDraft will be listed in the notes.

Out

See also 

 Seattle Sounders FC
 2016 in American soccer
 2016 Major League Soccer season

Notes 
A.  Player who were under contract with Seattle Sounders FC 2.

References 

Seattle Sounders FC seasons
Seattle Sounders Football Club
Seattle Sounders Football Club
2016 in sports in Washington (state)
Seattle Sounders FC
MLS Cup champion seasons